The battle of Garisi was fought between the Georgian and Safavid Iranian armies at the village of Garisi (present-day Tetritsqaro) in 1556, and resulted in a stalemate between both sides.

This conflict was an immediate consequence of the Treaty of Amasya signed between the Ottoman and Safavid empires in 1555. This peace deal left a fragmentized Kingdom of Georgia divided into spheres of influence. The kingdoms of Kartli and Kakheti, and the eastern part of the principality of Samtskhe, were allotted to the Safavids which had already garrisoned the Georgian capital of Tbilisi.

Luarsab I, the indomitable king of Kartli, refused to recognize the terms of the Amasya treaty and continued to worry Tbilisi. This provoked another Iranian expedition, the fourth in Luarsab's reign. The Safavid forces, the Qizilbash, placed by Shah Tahmasp I under the command of Shāhverdī Khān Ziyādoghlū Qājār, beylerbey of Karabakh, crossed into Kartli in 1556. Lursab and his son Svimon met the invaders at Garisi. In a pitched battle, the Georgians managed to beat off the Qizilbash, but Luarsab was killed in action.

References 

Garisi
Garisi
Garisi
16th century in Georgia (country)
16th century in Iran